How to Be a Composer is a British television documentary first shown on BBC Four in July 2009.

Background 
The show (2 × 1 hr, made by Diverse Production, produced and directed by Paul Yule), was based around the former New Musical Express journalist Paul Morley learning how to create a piece of classical music. The films observe Morley spending a year at the prestigious Royal Academy of Music in London. Even though Morley begins neither knowing how to read music nor how to play a musical instrument, by the end of the year, with the help of his tutor Christopher Austin and the students at the academy, we see the performance of his String Quartet.

External links
 

BBC television documentaries
2000s British documentary television series
2000s British music television series
2009 British television series debuts
2009 British television series endings
Royal Academy of Music